The eighth season of the talent show The Voice of Greece premiered on September 18, 2021 on Skai TV and Sigma TV. Giorgos Lianos is the host for the third time, while the three coaches from the previous five seasons, Helena Paparizou, Sakis Rouvas and Panos Mouzourakis return, welcoming Konstantinos Argyros as the new coach, replacing Eleonora Zouganeli. Valia Hatzitheodwrou will be the backstage host for all the rounds, except the Blind Auditions, replacing Laura Narjes.

Teams 
Color key

 Winner
 Runner-up
 Third place
 Fourth place
 Eliminated in the Live Shows
 Stolen in the Battles
 Eliminated in the Battles
 Stolen in the Knockouts
 Eliminated in the Knockouts

Blind auditions 
The blind auditions begin airing on September 18, 2021, being broadcast every Saturday and Sunday on Skai TV and Sigma TV.

Ratings

References

External links 
 Official website

Season 8
Voice of Greece 2021